Usonigbe is the name of a town about 60 miles away from Benin City in Edo State, Nigeria.  Usonigbe is located in Orhionmwon LGA, Edo State. Usonigbe, also known as Urhonigbe, is one of the richest in culture in Edo State, which gave her the popularity she has as a town. The town comprises three major quatars ( Idun n' Okaro popularly known as Iduneka, Idun-Ehen and Idun Ogo which is headed by the senior Qatar called Idun ugha). Added to these three major quatars of the town are two other villages, the Urhomehe and the Ovbiebo Camp. Urhonigbe is traditionally headed by Okavbo, who can be any confirm headest citizen of the town.

The Urhonigbe Festivals includes Izeki Festival which takes place at Urhonigbe in late February (1st 'moon' after the 12th moon) of every eighth year, The Igue Festival which takes place mild days of November month every year and The Ekaba Festival which is the most popular, it starts  last two weeks of December and span across the year to end during the first week of the New year.

Notable people
 King Wadada
 Richard Iyasere

Populated places in Edo State